La Makina was a Dominican merengue band formed in the 1990s. The group was organized by Fernando Colon (a former bassist for Los Sabrosos del Merengue) and Orlando Santana (who worked with Wilfrido Vargas and Toño Rosario). Several of the group's songs have ranked on the Hot Latin Songs chart in the United States. The band received a nomination for Tropical New Artist of the Year at the 1997 Lo Nuestro Awards.

References

Puerto Rican musical groups
Merengue music groups